The 2012 Canterbury-Bankstown Bulldogs season was the 78th in the club's history. Coached by Des Hasler and captained by Michael Ennis, they competed in the National Rugby League's 2012 Telstra Premiership, finishing the regular season in 1st place to take the minor premiership. They then won both of their finals matches to reach the 2012 NRL Grand final but were defeated by the Melbourne Storm.

Season summary
Having just won the 2011 NRL Grand final with the Manly-Warringah Sea Eagles, coach Des Hasler left the club to be head coach of the Bulldogs.

Under the NRL's revised final eight system, the Bulldogs only played two home finals matches, winning both of them to reach the grand final.

The club were the first in almost 50 years to win all three minor premierships, however none of the three teams were able to win a grand final.

Draw and results

2012 squad

*Flags mean countries that players represent.

2012 Signings/transfers 
Signings
Des Hasler Manly-Warringah Sea Eagles – Head Coach
Noel Cleal Manly-Warringah Sea Eagles – Recruitment Manager
James Graham ESL – St. Helens
James Gavet – Vulcans NSW Cup
Luke MacDougall – Saracens
Sione Kite – Melbourne Storm

Re-signed
David Stagg till 2012
Jake Foster till 2013
Corey Payne till 2013
Josh Morris till 2014
Michael Ennis till 2014
Ben Barba till 2015
Steve Turner till 2012
Bryson Goodwin till 2012
Tim Browne till 2013
Joel Romelo till 2012
Michael Lett till 2012

Transfers/leaving
Jarrad Hickey – Mid-Season – Wakefield Trinity Wildcats ESL
Jamal Idris – Gold Coast Titans
Ben Roberts – Parramatta Eels
Michael Hodgson – Retired
Gary Warburton- Celtic Crusaders, ESL
Andrew Ryan – Retired
Chris Armit – Penrith Panthers
Brad Morrin – Retired
Junior Tia-Kilifi – Penrith Panthers
Mickey Paea – Hull Kingston Rovers

See also
 List of Canterbury-Bankstown Bulldogs seasons

References

Canterbury-Bankstown Bulldogs seasons
Canterbury-Bankstown Bulldogs season